Echinosaura panamensis, the Panama teiid, is a species of lizard in the family Gymnophthalmidae. It is endemic to Panama.

References

Echinosaura
Reptiles of Panama
Endemic fauna of Panama
Reptiles described in 1924
Taxa named by Thomas Barbour